Hugh Worrall (born 8 November 1948) is a former Australian rules footballer who played with Fitzroy in the Victorian Football League (VFL).

Worrall spent two seasons at Fitzroy, mostly as a back pocket defender. He then returned to Cobden and won the Maskell Medal in 1970, 1972 and 1979.

References

External links
 
 

1948 births
Australian rules footballers from Victoria (Australia)
Fitzroy Football Club players
Cobden Football Club players
Living people